Cypripedium arietinum, the ram's head lady's slipper, is a rare orchid that grows in lightly shaded areas with calcareous soils. It is characteristic of the alvars around the Great Lakes in North America, as well as in New England. In Canada, it is found from Quebec to Saskatchewan, plus an isolated population in Nova Scotia, where it grows on gypsum based soils, 330 km away from the nearest population in Maine.

Description 
It typically has 3, but sometimes 4-5, leaves and normally has a single flower per flowering stem but in the form biflorum there maybe two flowers per stem. The purplish-red flower has light venation and is white at the lip. The flower has three petals, one modified into a densely hairy pouch with white and purplish markings. The sepals are green with reddish-brown markings and the side sepals are to some degree spirally twisted, linear to linear-lanceolate in shape, and are free, in contrast to other North American species in this genus. The other sepal is broadly elliptic to ovate-lanceolate in shape. It flowers in May and June. The diploid (2n) chromosome count is 20.

Distribution and habitat
Cypripedium arietinum is a forest understory species, it occurs in coniferous to mixed forests and in bogs dominated by Thuja occidentalis (northern white cedar), Larix laricina (tamarack), or Picea mariana (black spruce) where it grows on small mounds produced by Sphagnum mosses. It more commonly occurs in upland forests dominated by coniferous tree species such as Pinus resinosa (red pine) or Pinus banksiana (jack pine) in weakly acidic (or nearly neutral) soils composed of either loam or clay, it is also found in sandy soils.

Conservation 
Cypripedium arietinum is considered rare to extremely rare in all locations where it occurs. More specifically, it is rare in Ontario and rare in Manitoba. The ram's head lady's slipper is a threatened plant species in other areas within its range, including Wisconsin, Minnesota, Michigan, and Saskatchewan. It is believed to be extirpated in Connecticut. This species is listed as an endangered species in Nova Scotia.

The ram's head lady's slipper is difficult to cultivate and rarely survives transplantation to a garden from the wild. It should never be removed from any natural area.

References 

arietinum
Orchids of Canada
Orchids of the United States
Flora of Maine
Flora of Manitoba
Flora of Michigan
Flora of Minnesota
Flora of Nova Scotia
Flora of Ontario
Flora of Saskatchewan
Flora of Wisconsin
Taxa named by Robert Brown (botanist, born 1773)